Carex mackenziei is a species of flowering plant belonging to the family Cyperaceae.

Its native range is Northern Europe to Japan, Subarctic America to Northeastern USA.

References

mackenziei